Mark Anthony Keel (born October 1, 1961) is a former American football tight end in the National Football League (NFL) who played for the Kansas City Chiefs and Seattle Seahawks. He played college football for the Arizona Wildcats. He also played in the United States Football League (USFL) for the Arizona Wranglers, Chicago Blitz, and Jacksonville Bulls.

References

1961 births
Living people
American football tight ends
Kansas City Chiefs players
Seattle Seahawks players
Arizona Wranglers players
Chicago Blitz players
Jacksonville Bulls players
Arizona Wildcats football players
National Football League replacement players